Cannabis in Monaco is illegal. Despite the strong laws, the police and courts are often lenient, letting offenders off with a warning.

According to the World Drug Report 2011, 8.9% of the population use cannabis at least once per year.

References

Monaco
Politics of Monaco
Health in Monaco
Society of Monaco